Axu or AXU may refer to:

Akseli Kokkonen, also known as Axu Kokkonen (born 1984), Norwegian ski jumper
Axu Town, a town in the Garzê Tibetan Autonomous Prefecture of Sichuan, China
AXU, IATA sign for Axum Airport also known as Emperor Yohannes IV Airport, an airport serving Axum, [2] a city in the northern Tigray Region of Ethiopia